Derek Wayne Tennell (born February 12, 1964) is a former American football tight end in the National Football League (NFL) for the Cleveland Browns, Detroit Lions, Dallas Cowboys, and Minnesota Vikings. He played college football at UCLA. With Dallas, he beat the Buffalo Bills in Super Bowl XXVII.

Early years
Tennell attended West Covina High School where he practiced football, basketball and track. In his senior year as a running back, he registered 807 rushing yards and 7 touchdowns. 

In basketball, he averaged 19 points and 12.5 rebounds, while helping this team reach the Sierra League championship. In the 440-yard dash, he set the school record of 49.2 seconds.

College career
Tennell accepted a football scholarship from UCLA and began his college career as a fullback. As a sophomore, he was converted into a tight end. He was named the starter and was fourth on the team with 20 receptions for 167 yards. 

As a junior, he had 24 receptions (third on the team) for 252 yards (fourth on the team). As a senior, he posted 15 receptions for 152 yards and 3 touchdowns. He finished his college career as a three-year starter with 64 receptions for 602 yards and 3 touchdowns.

Professional career

Seattle Seahawks
Tennell was selected by the Seattle Seahawks in the seventh round (185th overall) of the 1987 NFL Draft. He was waived on September 8.

Cleveland Browns
In 1987, after the players went on a strike on the third week of the season, those games were canceled (reducing the 16 game season to 15) and the NFL decided that the games would be played with replacement players. Tennell was signed to be a part of the Cleveland Browns replacement team. He ended up playing well in those games as the starter at tight end and was kept for the rest of the season. He was the backup to Ozzie Newsome and played mainly on special teams. 

In 1988, he started 3 games, registering 9 receptions for 88 yards and one touchdown. He was released on December 11, 1989.

San Francisco 49ers
In 1990, he was signed by the San Francisco 49ers and was cut on August 31.

Detroit Lions
On April 26, 1991, he was signed as a free agent by the Detroit Lions, before being released on August 26. He was later re-signed after the season opener and played in the NFC title game against the Washington Redskins. He was cut on August 31, 1992.

Minnesota Vikings (first stint)
On September 28, 1992, he was signed as a free agent by the Minnesota Vikings, after starter Mike Tice suffered an injury. On November 3, he was cut after playing in 3 games.

Dallas Cowboys
On December 29, 1992, he was signed as a free agent to replace blocking tight end Alfredo Roberts, who had suffered a season-ending right knee injury in the last game against the Chicago Bears. In the playoff 34-10 win against the Philadelphia Eagles, he scored a touchdown. He was a part of the Super Bowl XXVII winning team.

Minnesota Vikings (second stint)
On April 21, 1993, he was signed as a free agent by the Minnesota Vikings. He was released on August 22, 1994.

References

External links
Cowboy Tennell Thinks of Father : Former UCLA tight end has more than Super Bowl on his mind

1964 births
Living people
Players of American football from California
Sportspeople from West Covina, California
American football tight ends
UCLA Bruins football players
Cleveland Browns players
Detroit Lions players
Minnesota Vikings players
Dallas Cowboys players
National Football League replacement players